Kinga Jókai Szilágyi (born 19 August 1997) is a Hungarian ice hockey player and member of the Hungarian national ice hockey team, currently playing with the EHV Sabres of the European Women's Hockey League (EWHL).

Jókai Szilágyi represented Hungary at four IIHF Women's U18 World Championships, appearing in the Division I tournaments in 2012 and 2015, and in the Top Division tournaments in 2013 and 2014. Her first tournament with the senior national team was the 2013 IIHF Women's World Championship Division II A, in which Hungary secured promotion to the Division I B. She appeared at the Division I B tournaments in 2014, 2015, and 2016, and at the Division I A tournaments in 2017, 2018, and 2019. At the 2021 IIHF Women's World Championship, she was a member of the first women's national team to represent Hungary at the Top Division level and was the team's second-highest point leader behind Fanni Gasparics, with one goal and three assists for four points in four games.

In addition to the EHV Sabres, her club career has been played with the women's representative team of KMH Budapest in the EWHL, with SC Weinfelden in the Swiss Leistungsklasse A (LKA), and with Luleå HF/MSSK of the Swedish Women's Hockey League (SDHL).

Her older sister, Zsófia Jókai Szilágyi, was a member of the Hungarian national ice hockey team from 2010 until 2021, when a back injury forced her to retire from elite play at age 28.

Career statistics

International 

Source(s):

References

External links 
 

Living people
1997 births
Hungarian women's ice hockey forwards
Luleå HF/MSSK players
KMH Budapest (women) players
20th-century Hungarian women
21st-century Hungarian women